Presidente Vargas Station is a subway station on the Rio de Janeiro Metro that services the Rio de Janeiro downtown.

References

Metrô Rio stations
Railway stations opened in 1979
1979 establishments in Brazil